Hermann Vallendor (13 April 1894 – 15 November 1974) was a German World War I flying ace.

Early life
Hermann Vallendor was born in Offenburg, the Grand Duchy of Baden on 13 April 1894. He was an engineering student in Mannheim before World War I began.

Service in World War I
Vallendor joined the 114th Infantry Regiment of the German Army on 16 October 1914. He was promoted to Gefreiter on 19 May 1915. He was awarded the Iron Cross Second Class on 29 July 1915. A promotion to Vizefeldwebel followed on 5 December 1915. He then was raised from the enlisted ranks, being commissioned as a leutnant in the reserves on 24 December 1915.

He transferred to aviation duty and began pilot's training with FEA 5 on 16 October 1916. When he completed pilot's school, he exited training for Armee Flugpark 2 on 19 February 1917. In May 1917, he went to FA 23 to fly two-seaters. He soon left that detachment, to begin attending fighter pilot's school on 24 June 1917. He was then posted to a fighter unit, Jagdstaffel 2 on 5 July 1917. As was customary in German military aviation of the time, Vallendor had his aircraft emblazoned in his personal insignia. In his case, the marking was a huge white "V" on the fuselage. When he used a Fokker Triplane, he also had the "V" painted on its top wing.

Vallendor received the Order of the Zähringer Lion from his native Baden on 14 December 1917. He achieved his first aerial victory on 3 February 1918. He was awarded the Iron Cross First Class on 7 March 1918 and went on to score five more victories before war's end.

List of aerial victories
See also Aerial victory standards of World War I

Post World War I
After war's end, Vallendor moved to Buenos Aires, Argentina in 1920 to work for Deutsche Bank. He went on to Montevideo, Uruguay in 1921; there he founded a still existent family wholesale optical concern. When he died on 15 November 1974 in Montevideo, he was buried in the British Cemetery there, in Plot E248.

References

Further reading
 Above the Lines: The Aces and Fighter Units of the German Air Service, Naval Air Service and Flanders Marine Corps, 1914–1918. Norman Franks, Frank W. Bailey, Russell Guest. Grub Street, 1993. , .

 Jagdstaffel 2 Boelcke: Von Richthofen's Mentor: Volume 26 of Aviation Elite Units: Volume 26 of Osprey Aviation Elite. Greg VanWyngarden. Osprey Publishing, 2007. , .

 No. 56 Squadron RAF/RFC. Alex Revell, 2009. 

1894 births
1974 deaths
People from Offenburg
German World War I flying aces
Recipients of the Iron Cross (1914), 1st class
Luftstreitkräfte personnel
People from the Grand Duchy of Baden
Military personnel from Baden-Württemberg